Andrew Svoboda (born October 2, 1979) is an American professional golfer.

Svoboda was born in New Rochelle, New York. He played college golf at St. Johns University in New York City. He won 14 college tournaments including the 2001 Big East Conference Championship.

Svoboda played on the Hooters Tour from 2005 to 2009, winning once.  In 2009, he finished 49th at Qualifying School to earn a place on the  Web.com Tour, where he played from 2010 to 2012.

He earned his 2013 PGA Tour card by finishing 21st on the Web.com Tour money list in 2012. He played on the PGA Tour in 2013, but also played a few events on the Web.com Tour as he struggled on the PGA Tour. He won the 2013 Price Cutter Charity Championship on the Web.com Tour in August. He finished 25th on the 2013 Web.com Tour regular season money list to earn his 2014 PGA Tour card. He then won the second event of the Web.com Tour Finals, the Chiquita Classic.

Svoboda played on the PGA Tour in 2014 (finishing 94th, his best year) and 2015, but returned to the Web.com Tour for 2016.

Svoboda has qualified for the U.S. Open four times with a best finish of T-71 in 2008. His best finish on the PGA Tour is T-2 at the 2014 Zurich Classic of New Orleans. Svoboda barely maintained Web.com Tour privileges for 2016, finishing 75th on the Finals money list.

Amateur wins
14 college wins
2004 Metropolitan Amateur

Professional wins (9)

Web.com Tour wins (3)

Web.com Tour playoff record (1–0)

Other wins (7)
2003 Metropolitan Open (as an amateur)
2007 New York State Open
2009 Rock Springs Ridge Classic (Hooters Tour)
2018 New York State Open, Long Island Open, Metropolitan Open
2019 Long Island Open
2021 Long Island Open

Results in major championships

CUT = missed the half-way cut
"T" = tied

See also
2012 Web.com Tour graduates
2013 Web.com Tour Finals graduates

References

External links

American male golfers
St. John's Red Storm men's golfers
PGA Tour golfers
Korn Ferry Tour graduates
Golfers from New York (state)
Sportspeople from New Rochelle, New York
People from Larchmont, New York
1979 births
Living people